Vladimir Ţurcan (born 14 October 1954) is a Moldovan judge and former politician.

Biography 
Vladimir Turcan was born on 14 October 1954 and in the town of Slobodzeya, Moldavian SSR. In 1976 he graduated from Faculty of Law at Moscow State University. In 1985, he graduated from the Kyiv Institute of Political Science and Social Management. In 1988, he graduated from the Kyiv Higher Party School. From 1976 to 1982, he investigator in the Prosecutor's Office of the MSSR. From 1986-1990, he was a deputy of the Supreme Soviet of Moldova. In the early 90s, he was General Director of the Moldavian-Belarusian enterprise Zubr. On 11 February 1997, he was appointed First Deputy Minister of the Interior. He held the position until 21 December 1999. On 21 March 2002, he was appointed as the Ambassador of Moldova to Russia. He was also concurrently appointed as Ambassador to Finland. He would later hold the posts of ambassador to Kazakhstan, Turkmenistan and Armenia. On 16 August 2019, he was appointed president of the Constitutional Court of Moldova.

He was also a member of the Parliament of Moldova from 2005-2010 and from 2014-2019.

External links 
 Site-ul Parlamentului Republicii Moldova

References

1954 births
Living people
Moldovan MPs 2001–2005
Moldovan MPs 2009–2010
Moldovan Ministers of the Interior
Communist Party of Moldavia politicians
Party of Communists of the Republic of Moldova politicians
Constitutional Court of Moldova judges